T Khun Myat (born 30 October 1949) is a Burmese politician, lawyer and Speaker of the Union Assembly, the Joint House and Pyithu Hluttaw, the lower house of the Myanmar parliament. In both 2010 election and 2015 election, he contested and won the Kutkai Township constituency for a seat in the country's lower house.

After the military coup in 2021, according to Article (424) of the Constitution and Article (17) of the Pyithu Hluttaw Law, T Khun Myat continues to serve as the Speaker of the Hluttaw.

Background
T Khun Myat is an ethnic Kachin and a descendant of a prominent Kachin traditional ruling Duwa family, the "T" at the beginning of his name comes from his family clan name Tangbau. He is a Christian.

Career
T Khun Myat served as the legal director at the Office of the Attorney General as well as the leader of People's Militia Forces in Kutkai Township under the control of Burmese Army between 1990 and 2010. He was involved in the commission drafting the constitution in 2007 and the commission of 2008 Myanmar constitutional referendum. He also served as the executive member of Union Solidarity and Development Party for northern Shan State.

He was elected as a member of the Pyithu Hluttaw in the 2010 general elections for the Shan State constituency of Kutkai.

He was also chair of the Committee on Bills in the Lower House (2011–16), a body tasked with drafting new legislation and amending or repealing laws considered out of date.

Along with the other allies of Shwe Mann, T Khun Myatt was sacked from the Union Solidarity and Development Party.

Following the resignation of Win Myint as speaker of the House of Representatives, T Khun Myatt was elected by the Pyithu Hluttaw as the next speaker. He was sworn in on 22 March 2018. Although many state- and union-level politicians, including Aung San Suu Kyi and Win Myint, were placed under house arrest during the 2021 Myanmar coup d'état on 1 February, T Khun Myat remained in his office under the Constitution of Myanmar. He attended the meeting of National Defence and Security Council which was hold on 31 January 2022.That meeting extended the State of Emergency to next (6) months.

In January 2023, T Khun Myat was awarded the civilian title of Thiri Pyanchi by the military junta.

Drug controversy
T Khun Myat was the former leader of a militia in Kutkai Township and accused of involvement in illicit drug trade and money laundering. He had been a shareholder in the now-defunct Myanmar May Flower Bank, which was abolished due to money laundering in the illicit drugs industry. He has denied any accusation of his involvement in the drug trade.

References

Members of Pyithu Hluttaw
Speakers of the House of Representatives of Myanmar
1949 births
Living people
Burmese people of Kachin descent
Burmese Christians